Roger Fabrizio Romeo is a retired Brazilian footballer. He was the first Brazilian who played for Esteghlal in the Premier Football League.

Club career

Club career statistics
Last Update: 30 August 2010

Notes

Brazilian footballers
Association football forwards
Esteghlal F.C. players
Living people
Brazilian expatriate footballers
Expatriate footballers in Iran
Year of birth missing (living people)